Norwood High School may refer to:

United States
Norwood High School (Colorado) in San Miguel County
Norwood High School (Massachusetts) in Norfolk County
Norwood High School (Ohio)

Elsewhere
Norwood District High School, Norwood, Ontario, Canada
Norwood International High School, South Australia, established in 1910